The Central Organization of Statistics & Information Technology (COSIT) or the Central Organization for Statistics (COS) is the Government of Iraq's statistics agency. It has its headquarters in Hay Al-Elwiya, Baghdad.

References

External links

 Central Organization for Statistics
 Central Organization for Statistics 

Government agencies of Iraq
Iraq